Dave Martindale (born 9 April 1964) is an English former professional footballer who played as midfielder for Tranmere Rovers.

References

1964 births
Living people
Footballers from Liverpool
Association football midfielders
English footballers
Caernarfon Town F.C. players
Tranmere Rovers F.C. players
Glentoran F.C. players
English Football League players